Iliza Shlesinger: Freezing Hot is a 2015 American stand-up comedy film written by and starring Iliza Shlesinger, Iliza Shlesinger's second stand-up comedy special for Netflix, following War Paint from 2013. In Freezing Hot, filmed in Denver, Iliza talks about how men and women are different, silk blouses, pumpkin spice lattes, Pinterest and more.

Cast
 Iliza Shlesinger

Release
It was released on January 23, 2015 on Netflix.

References

External links
 
 
 

2015 television specials
Netflix specials
Stand-up comedy concert films
Shlesinger, Iliza: Freezing Hot
2010s English-language films